15 Scaffolds for a Murderer or The Dirty Fifteen is a 1967 action drama mystery Spaghetti Western film directed by Nunzio Malasomma, scored by Francesco De Masi, and starring Craig Hill, Andrea Bosic, George Martin and Margarita Lozano. It was the last film of Nunzio Malasomma, who died in 1974.

Cast

References

External links
 
 15 Scaffolds for a Murderer at Variety Distribution
 

1967 drama films
1967 Western (genre) films
1967 films
Italian action drama films
1960s action drama films
Italian mystery drama films
1960s mystery drama films
Spaghetti Western films
Films directed by Nunzio Malasomma
Films scored by Francesco De Masi
Films shot in Rome
Films shot in Almería
Films shot in Madrid
1960s Italian films